Saghi Ghahraman (born ) is a Persian poet who is in the list of 100 Women (BBC) and is head of Iranian Queer Organization.

Early life 
Saqi Ghareman was born in Mashhad in 1957, she founded Gilgamishan Publishing House in 2010, which focuses on publishing Iranian queer literature. In 2007, Shargh newspaper was banned for publishing a poem from her. She is now living in Canada.

References

1957 births
Living people
Iranian poets
People from Mashhad
Queer writers
BBC 100 Women